State Route 339 (SR 339) is a  state highway completely within Towns County near Young Harris, Georgia, in the North Georgia mountains, just south of the North Carolina state line. It is locally known as Crooked Creek Road.

Route description
SR 339 begins at an intersection with SR 66 just north of SR 66's crossing of Brasstown Creek. The appropriately named Crooked Creek Road includes a number of sharp curves and turns along its length.

SR 339 is not part of the National Highway System, a system of roadways important to the nation's economy, defense, and mobility.

History

SR 339 was built between 1960 and 1963 on its current alignment. It has seen little change since then, except for shoulder widening.

Major intersections

See also

References

External links

 Peach State Roads page on Georgia SR 339, with photos
 Local.live.com aerial view of Georgia SR 339

339
Transportation in Towns County, Georgia